Iglica is a genus of very small freshwater snails with an operculum, aquatic gastropod mollusks in the family Moitessieriidae.

Species
Species within the genus Iglica include:
Iglica acicularis Angelov, 1959
Iglica alpheus A. Reischutz & P. L. Reischutz, 2004
Iglica bagliviaeformis Schütt, 1970
Iglica bosnica Schütt, 1975
Iglica calepii Niero & Pezzoli, 2016
Iglica concii Pollonera, 1887 (uncertain)
Iglica elongata Kuščer, 1933
Iglica eximia Bole, 1967
Iglica forumjuliana Pollonera, 1887
Iglica gracilis (Clessin, 1882)
Iglica gratulabunda (A. J. Wagner, 1910)
Iglica hauffeni Brusina, 1886
Iglica hellenica Falniowski & Sarbu, 2015
Iglica illyrica Schütt, 1975
Iglica kanalitensis A. Reischütz, N. Steiner-Reischütz & P. L. Reischütz, 2016
Iglica karamani Kuščer, 1935
Iglica kleinzellensis P. L. Reischütz, 1981
Iglica langhofferi A. J. Wagner, 1928
Iglica luxurians Kuščer, 1932
Iglica maasseni Schütt, 1980
Iglica seyadi Backhyus & Boeters, 1974
Iglica sidariensis Schütt, 1980
Iglica soussensis Ghamizi & Boulal, 2017
Iglica tellinii Pollonera, 1887
Iglica wolfischeri A. Reischutz & P. L. Reischutz, 2004
Iglica xhuxhi A. Reischütz, N. Reischütz & P. L. Reischütz, 2014
Species brought into synonymy
 Iglica absoloni (A. J. Wagner, 1914): synonym of Paladilhiopsis absoloni (A. J. Wagner, 1914)
 Iglica gittenbergeri A. Reischutz & P. L. Reischutz, 2008: synonym of Paladilhiopsis gittenbergeri (A. Reischutz & P. L. Reischutz, 2008) (original combination)
 Iglica matjasici Bole, 1961: synonym of Vinodolia matjasici (Bole, 1961) (original combination)

References

 Wagner, A. J. (1928). Studien zur Molluskenfauna der Balkanhalbinsel mit besonderer Berücksichtigung Bulgariens und Thraziens, nebst monographischer Bearbeitung einzelner Gruppen. Annales Zoologici Musei Polonici Historiae Naturalis. 6 (4): 263-399, pl. 10-23. Warszawa.
 Schütt, H. (1975). Die Formen der Gattung Iglica A. J. Wagner Archiv für Molluskenkunde. 106(1/3): 1-14

External links
 Hofman S., Rysiewska A., Osikowski A., Grego J., Sket B., Prevorčnik S., Zagmajster M. & Falniowski A. (2018). Phylogenetic relationships of the Balkan Moitessieriidae (Caenogastropoda: Truncatelloidea). Zootaxa. 4486(3): 311-339
  Falniowski A. & Sarbu S. (2015). Two new Truncatelloidea species from Melissotrypa Cave in Greece (Caenogastropoda). ZooKeys. 530: 1-14

 
Gastropod genera